Peggy Lam Pei Yu-dja, GBS, OBE (born 1928) is a Beijing loyalist politician in Hong Kong. She is the chief executive officer of the Family Planning Association of Hong Kong.

Family
She graduated from the University of Shanghai with a Bachelor of Arts. She received a certificate in family planning from the University of Chicago and a certificate in Public Health Administration from the University of Michigan.

Lam is the second youngest cousin of architect, I. M. Pei.

Politics
She was a member of the Preparatory Committee for the Hong Kong Special Administrative Region. She was also a member of Legislative Council and the Chinese People’s Political Consultative Conference, and Chairman of the Wan Chai District Council.

In 2000, Lam was the chairperson of the Hong Kong Federation of Women, an organisation formed under the direction of Beijing to align pro-China forces.

Honours
She was appointed as the Justice of the Peace in 1981. She later awarded the Member of the Order of the British Empire (MBE) in 1985, the Officer of the Order of the British Empire (OBE) in 1993. After the establishment of HKSAR, she was awarded the Silver Bauhinia Star (SBS) in 1998 and the Gold Bauhinia Star (GBS) in 2003.

References

External links

1928 births
Living people
Officers of the Order of the British Empire
University of Chicago alumni
University of Michigan School of Public Health alumni
Place of birth missing (living people)
Recipients of the Gold Bauhinia Star
Recipients of the Silver Bauhinia Star
District councillors of Wan Chai District
Progressive Hong Kong Society politicians
Members of the Provisional Legislative Council
Hong Kong Christians
HK LegCo Members 1988–1991
HK LegCo Members 1991–1995
Members of the Preparatory Committee for the Hong Kong Special Administrative Region
Members of the Selection Committee of Hong Kong
University of Shanghai alumni
20th-century Hong Kong women politicians